Warden is a village located in the province of Quebec, part of La Haute-Yamaska Regional County Municipality in the administrative area of Estrie. The population as of the Canada 2011 Census was 358. The village is almost completely encircled by the municipality of Shefford with Saint-Joachim-de-Shefford, as its only other border, to the north.

Demographics 

Population trend:

Mother tongue language (2006)

See also
List of village municipalities in Quebec

References

Villages in Quebec
Incorporated places in La Haute-Yamaska Regional County Municipality